The third Martin ministry was the thirteenth ministry of the Colony of New South Wales, and the third and final occasion of being led by Sir James Martin.

Martin was elected in the first free elections for the New South Wales Legislative Assembly held in 1856. He came to power as Premier on the first occasion after Charles Cowper's government fell in October 1863. Martin was asked to form government on the second occasion, this time in coalition with his former rival, Henry Parkes, after Cowper again lost the confidence of the Assembly in December 1865. Martin came to power on this occasion, after Cowper again lost confidence of the Assembly.

The title of Premier was widely used to refer to the Leader of Government, but not enshrined in formal use until 1920.

There was no party system in New South Wales politics until 1887. Under the constitution, ministers were required to resign to recontest their seats in a by-election when appointed. A poll was required for West Sydney with Sir John Robertson and William Windeyer comfortably re-elected. The other ministers were all re-elected unopposed.

This ministry covers the period from 16 December 1870 until 13 May 1872, when Martin retired. Upon retirement from politics, he was appointed as Chief Justice of New South Wales.

Composition of ministry

Ministers are members of the Legislative Assembly unless otherwise noted.

See also

Self-government in New South Wales
Members of the New South Wales Legislative Assembly, 1869–1872
Members of the New South Wales Legislative Assembly, 1872–1874
First Martin ministry (1863–1865)
Second Martin ministry (1866–1868)

References

 

New South Wales ministries
1870 establishments in Australia
1872 disestablishments in Australia